New Mexico State Road 68 (NM 68) is a  state highway in northern New Mexico, in the Southwestern United States. NM 68 is known as the "River Road to Taos", as its route follows the Rio Grande. A parallel route to the east is NM 76, which is called the "High Road to Taos".

Route description

NM 68 begins in the south in Española at the road's junction with U.S. Route 285 and U.S. Route 84 which run concurrently at that point. The road then runs northeast through Alcalde, Velarde, Embudo, and Ranchos de Taos, where it meets the north end of New Mexico State Road 518, before reaching its northern terminus at U.S. Route 64 in Taos.

Between Española and Velarde, State Road 68 is a four-lane divided highway with a  speed limit (with a  limit as it nears Velarde and  limit through Velarde); between Velarde and Taos, Highway 68 is a two-lane highway with very few passing lanes.

Future
Several plans involve safety improvements on NM 68 at its intersection with US 64.

Major intersections

See also

 List of state roads in New Mexico

References

External links

068
Transportation in Rio Arriba County, New Mexico
Transportation in Taos County, New Mexico